New Zealand College of Education (NZCOE) claimed to offer courses online and at its Auckland campus at 60 Symonds St in Grafton, which was a grass-covered lot that had been vacant for many years. A professional looking website had contact details that had no connection with a college. Images on it appeared to mostly be stock photos.

Regency Management Centre Limited was incorporated in January 2015. Its registered office address from 23 July 2018 to 20 November 2018 was "New Zealand College of Education - Symonds Tower, 60 Symonds Street, Auckland". It was removed from the companies register in February 2019.

The college is not accredited by the New Zealand Qualifications Authority to deliver educational programmes in New Zealand.

References

Education in Auckland
Confidence tricks
Unaccredited institutions of higher learning